Melanie Rose Papalia (born July 11, 1984) is a Canadian actress. She has appeared in films such as Postal (2007), American Pie Presents: The Book of Love (2009), Frankie and Alice (2010), Smiley (2012), The Den (2013), and Hell or High Water (2016). Papalia has also appeared in various television series including Intelligence (2005), Painkiller Jane (2007), Endgame (2011), Suits (2014), and You Me Her (2016-2020).

Filmography

Film

Television

Video games

References

External links
 
 

Living people
Actresses from Vancouver
Canadian film actresses
Canadian television actresses
21st-century Canadian actresses
1984 births
Canadian people of Italian descent